Mouse on Mars is a German electronic music duo formed in 1993 by Jan St. Werner and Andi Toma. Their music is a blend of electronic genres including IDM, dub, krautrock, breakbeat and ambient, featuring heavy use of organic analog synth and cross-frequency modulation. Their music also features live instrumentation including strings, horns, drums, bass, and guitar.

History
St. Werner, from Cologne, and Toma, from Düsseldorf, are childhood friends who were born on the same day and in the same hospital. They both experimented with electronic music in the mid 1990s. On earlier recordings, their music was primarily krautrock, dub, techno and ambient, and did not feature vocals, but more recent recordings increasingly include vocals from featured guest artists, many of whom have toured with the duo.

Their first album, Vulvaland, was released in 1994 on the British record label Too Pure. Sean Cooper of AllMusic stated that it is "a wibbly, barely digital match of ambient texturology with experimental strains of techno, dub, and Krautrock." Their second album, Iaora Tahiti, has a much more playful feel and encompasses a wider variety of electronic dance genres. Over the years, their sound has increased in warmth, playfulness and what the duo term "fantastic analysis". Their sixth album Niun Niggung (released on Domino Records in 2000), showed live instruments becoming more prominent. Idiology, their seventh album, continued this practice, and on their eighth album, Radical Connector, they took more of an accessible "pop" approach; both also increasingly included vocals, primarily from touring drummer Dodo NKishi.

Mouse on Mars regularly perform live as a three-piece, with Toma & St. Werner augmented by drummer Dodo NKishi. In 2005, they released their first live album, titled Live 04.

The band released their tenth full album, Parastrophics, almost six years later, in February 2012. It was their first album to be released under Modeselektor's Monkeytown record label. Following this another six years later, the band reunited with Thrill Jockey to release Dimensional People in April 2018.

St. Werner has released solo work under his own name, and as Lithops and Noisemashinetapes.
 St. Werner also partners with Markus Popp of Oval for Microstoria. St. Werner has also collaborated with the renowned visual artist Rosa Barba.
While releasing albums on British indie labels, Mouse on Mars started their own label, Sonig, on which they release their own work and that of other German artists. They have also produced a number of EPs and have recorded music for film soundtracks as well as remixing the work of other musicians.

In 2018 with the release of the Dimensional People release, the band perform under the name of Dimensional People Ensemble, an ensemble of drums, horns, strings, vocals, and electronic instruments, played by robotics and humanoids.

Collaborations
Mouse on Mars collaborated in the studio and toured with Stereolab in the mid 1990s – the results can be heard on Stereolab's Dots and Loops album and the associated Miss Modular single, and Mouse on Mars' Cache Cœur Naïf EP. St. Werner and Lætitia Sadier have also performed karaoke duets. 
 
The duo collaborated with Mark E. Smith of The Fall in a band called Von Südenfed in 2007. Their album is called Tromatic Reflexxions.

A mini album was released November 2012, titled WOW. The album marked the duo's first recorded collaboration with the vocalist Dao Anh Khanh, producer Eric D. Clarke and the punk band, Las Kellies.

Discography

Studio albums
 Vulvaland (1994)
 Iaora Tahiti (1995)
 Autoditacker (1997)
 Instrumentals (1997)
 Glam (1998)
 Niun Niggung (1999)
 Idiology (2001)
 Radical Connector (2004)
 Varcharz (2006)
 Parastrophics (2012)
 Dimensional People (2018)
 AAI (2021)

Live albums
 2005 Live 04

Mini albums
 2012 WOW

Collaborations
 2007 Tromatic Reflexxions (with Mark E. Smith as Von Südenfed)

Compilations
1994 Trance Europe Express – Volume 3 CD 2, track 01: Mouse On Mars – Maus Mobil (6:30)
1998 1001 – On In Memoriam Gilles Deleuze on the label Mille Plateaux
1998 Illuminati – a remix album of The Pastels
 2003 Rost Pocks: The EP Collection 2006 Silver Monk Time – a tribute to the monks (29 bands cover the MONKS)
 2014 21 Again (Collaborations)Singles and EPs
 1994 Frosch 1995 Bib 1995 Saturday Night Worldcup Fieber 1997 Cache Cœur Naïf (EP)
 1997 Twift 1999 Pickly Dred Rhizzoms (EP)
 1999 Distroia 1999 Diskdusk 2001 Actionist Respoke 2002 Agit Itter It 2005 Wipe That Sound 2012 They Know Your Name 2014 Spezmodia 2017 Synaptics'' EP

References

External links
 Official Site
 
 
 Mouse on Mars at Sonig record label
 Paradical.de – unofficial mouse on mars homepage with extensive discography
 Best Special Effects Winner  in Berlin Music Video Awards, 2013
 Mouse On Mars on BandNext

German electronic music groups
German musical duos
Electronic music duos
Male musical duos
Intelligent dance musicians
Thrill Jockey artists
Musical groups from Düsseldorf
Domino Recording Company artists
Ipecac Recordings artists
Too Pure artists
Rough Trade Records artists